David or Dave Green may refer to:

Sportspeople

Gridiron football
 Dave Green (American football) (born 1949), American football punter
 David Green (American football) (born 1972), American football running back
 David Green (Canadian football) (born 1953), Canadian football running back

Cricket
 David Green (cricketer, born 1935) (1935–2020), English cricketer
 David Green (cricketer, born 1939) (1939–2016), Welsh cricketer

Other sports
 David Green (baseball) (1960–2022), Nicaraguan-born baseball player
 David Green (equestrian) (born 1960), Australian Olympic equestrian
 David Green (racing driver) (born 1958), Busch Series race car driver
 Dave Boy Green (born 1953), British boxer

Arts and entertainment
 David Green (director) (born 1948), film director
 David Gordon Green (born 1975), American filmmaker
 Dave Green (director) (born 1983), American film and music video director
 Dave Green (journalist), journalist and broadcaster
 Dave Green (musician) (born 1942), British jazz bassist

Other people
 David Green (civil engineer) (born 1937), British civil engineer
 David Green (Director of the SFO) (born 1954), British prosecutor, Director of Serious Fraud Office
 David Green (entrepreneur) (born 1941), entrepreneur & founder of Hobby Lobby Creative Centers
 David Green (political adviser) (1922–2007), adviser to Illinois governor Daniel Walker
 David Green (politician) (1951–2014), American politician
 David Green (social entrepreneur) (born 1956), founder of Project Impact
 David Green (university administrator), Vice-Chancellor of the University of Worcester
 David Allen Green (born 1971), English lawyer, sceptic and blogger
 David E. Green (1910–1983), American biochemist
 David George Green (born 1951), British think tank CEO
 David S. Green (19th-century), Mississippi legislator and minister
 David W. Green (biochemist), biochemist known for developing isomorphous replacement
 David W. Green (psychologist), British professor of psychology at University College London
 Dave Green (astrophysicist) (born 1959), British astronomer
 Dave Green (police officer) (1938–2012), American undercover police officer
 G. David Green (born 1948), former chairman of the Dartington Hall Trust and The Prince's School of Traditional Arts

See also
 David Greene (disambiguation)
 David Grün (1886–1973),  birth name of David Ben-Gurion